Middle-low Chuvash ( Anat Jenchi ) - are a sub-ethnos of the Chuvash. Their native area of settlement is in the northeast of Chuvashia. As a result of migrations, representatives of the middle-lower Chuvash have also settled in many other parts of the Southern Urals and Volga regions.

Culture

Traditional dress 
It is believed that the traditional clothing of the middle-lower Chuvash has preserved the most ancient look, in contrast to the other Chuvash Sub groups who were influenced by other peoples (Viryal- Finno-Ugric, Anatri- the influence of the Tatars ).

Chuvashia
Ural Federal District
Volga Federal District